Sympodium  may refer to:
 Sympodial branching, a pattern of branching, similar to dichotomous branching in botany
 Sympodium (coral), a genus of soft corals
 SMART Sympodium interactive pen display, a device associated with the Smart Board